The Czech Golf Federation is the National Sporting Organisation for the Sport of Golf in the Czech Republic and is affiliated with both the IGF (International Golf Federation) which oversees the international governance and development of Table Tennis and the EGA (European Golf Association) which oversees the sport development at a regional level.

Czech Golf Federation is member of the Czech Olympic Committee.

History
Golf Federation was founded in 1990 as Bohemian–Moravian Golf Union. In 1993 it succeeded Czechoslovak Golf Federation.

References

External links
Czech Golf Federation

National members of the European Golf Association
Czech Republic
Golf in the Czech Republic
Golf
International Golf Federation